The 1888 Cornell Big Red football team was an American football team that represented Cornell University during the 1888 college football season.  The team compiled a 4–2 record and outscored all opponents by a combined total of 96 to 20.

Schedule

References

Cornell
Cornell Big Red football seasons
Cornell Big Red football